Prince of Chimay is a title of Belgian and Dutch nobility associated with the town of Chimay in what is now Belgium. The title is currently held by Philippe de Caraman-Chimay, 22nd Prince de Chimay. The main residence of the princely family is Chimay Castle (French: Château de Chimay), which is located in the town of Chimay in the Hainaut province of Belgium.

Counts of Chimay 
1 Jean II de Croÿ, comte de Chimay (1395–1473) 
2 Philippe de Croÿ, comte de Chimay (1437–1482)
3 Charles de Croÿ, comte de Chimay (1455–1527)

Princes of Chimay

House of Croÿ 

Charles I of Croÿ, 1st Prince of Chimay (1455–1527) 
Anne de Croÿ, princesse de Chimay;married to Philippe II de Croÿ, duc d'Arschot (1496–1549)
Charles II of Croÿ, 3rd Prince of Chimay (1522–1551)
Philippe III de Croÿ;married to Jeanne of Halewijn.
Charles III of Croÿ, 5th Prince of Chimay;married to Marie de Brimeu.
Anne of Croÿ, Princess of Chimay;married to Charles de Ligne, 2nd Prince of Arenberg.

House of Arenberg 

Charles de Ligne, 2nd Prince of Arenberg;married to Anne of Croÿ, Princess of Chimay;
Alexander of Arenberg, 7th Prince of Chimay;married to Madeleine of Egmont.

 Albert of Arenberg, 8th Prince of Chimay (died 1648)
 Philippe of Arenberg, 9th prince de Chimay (died 1675)
 Ernest-Dominique of Arenberg, 10th Prince of Chimay (born 1643)
Anna-Isabella of Arenberg, Princess of Chimay (1616–1658); married to Eugène de Hénin, 6th Count of Bossu and Marquess of la Vere.

House of Hénin-Liétard 
12 Alexandre Gabriel Joseph de Hénin-Liétard, prince de Chimay (1681–1745)
13 Thomas Alexandre Marc Henri de Hénin-Liétard, prince de Chimay (1732–1759)
14 Thomas Alexandre Marc Maurice de Hénin-Liétard, prince de Chimay (1759–1761)
15 Philippe Gabriel Maurice Joseph de Hénin-Liétard, prince de Chimay (1736–1804)

House of Riquet de Caraman 
16 François Joseph Philippe de Riquet, prince de Chimay (1771–1843)
17 Joseph Philippe de Riquet, prince de Chimay (1808–1886)
18 Marie Joseph Guy Henry Philippe de Riquet, prince de Chimay (1836–1892)
19 Marie Joseph Anatole Élie, prince de Chimay (1858–1937)
20 Joseph Marie Alexandre Pierre Ghislain, prince de Chimay (1921–1990) (renounced his titles)
21 Élie Marie Charles Pierre Paul, prince de Chimay (1924–1980)
22 Philippe Joseph Marie Jean, prince de Chimay (born 1948)

Prince de Chimay ad personam (1834)
 Alphonse de Caraman-Chimay, prince de Chimay (1810–1865)

Prince de Chimay (1865)
  (1844–1928)
 Alphonse, prince de Chimay (1899–1973)

See also
Chimay Castle
Hôtel de Chimay
House of Hénin

References

External links

 Eupedia page about the family
 Château de Chimay website - main page
 Château de Chimay website - family history
 Princes of Chimay - history 
 Arms of the Princes of Chimay 
 Heraldry of the House of Chimay 

 
 
Lists of Belgian nobility